James Roger Cartlidge (born 30 April 1974) is a British Conservative Party politician. He has been the Member of Parliament (MP) for South Suffolk since 2015, and has been serving as Exchequer Secretary to the Treasury since October 2022. He served as Parliamentary Under-Secretary of State for Justice between 2021 and 2022.

Early life and education
James Cartlidge was born on 30 April 1974. He was educated at Queen Elizabeth's School, which was a comprehensive when he attended but for most of its history has been a state grammar school for boys in the market town of Chipping Barnet in north west London, followed by the University of Manchester, where he studied Economics. Cartlidge ran an SME before entering Parliament, having founded Share to Buy Ltd, a shared ownership property portal and host of the London Home Show, a major event for first time buyers.

Political career
Cartlidge stood for parliament in Lewisham Deptford in the 2005 general election finishing third. He was also an elected member of Babergh District Council before his election to the House of Commons in May 2015.
 
In the 2015 general election Cartlidge won 53% of the vote, 34% more than the second place candidate from the Labour Party. Cartlidge won 2,996 more votes than the last election of his predecessor, the veteran MP Tim Yeo, who retired before Cartlidge's election having been de-selected.
 
Cartlidge has championed South Suffolk produce and one of his first political acts was to bring a barrel of beer from Suffolk into the House of Commons, which he drank with his new parliamentary colleagues. He also held a South Suffolk Food Day in the House of Commons which featured businesses such as Jimmy's Farm, Suffolk Food Hall and Gifford's Hall Vineyard.
 
Cartlidge has worked to improve mobile phone signal in the constituency and launched a campaign in Boxford for greater efforts to provide mobile telephone signal in 'not-spots'. He has taken a train journey from Sudbury to Marks Tey with Rail Executives from Abellio Greater Anglia, Network Rail and the Department for Transport to highlight issues for people travelling by train in the constituency.
 
In March 2016, Cartlidge called an Adjournment debate in the House of Commons of the United Kingdom on flexible rail ticketing. In this debate he called for part-time season tickets to provide greater flexibility and value for money for his constituents who commute to London two to three times a week. He has continued to campaign for part-time season tickets, writing an article for Politics Home in February 2020. Cartlidge has also stated that COVID-19 has exacerbated the need for part-time season tickets.
 
Cartlidge was elected to the Public Accounts Commission in November 2015 and the Work and Pensions Committee in October 2016.
 
Cartlidge was opposed to Brexit prior to the 2016 referendum.
 
In January 2018 he was appointed as PPS to the Health Secretary, Jeremy Hunt, and remained his PPS when Hunt was promoted as Foreign Secretary. In August 2019 he was appointed as PPS to the Defence Secretary, Ben Wallace. In February 2020 he was appointed as PPS to the Chancellor of the Exchequer, Rishi Sunak.
 
In 2019 Cartlidge was one of 73 MPs to vote against equal marriage in Northern Ireland. He has publicly expressed his strong support for equal marriage but voted against imposing this law in Northern Ireland 'in absentia'.

On 17 September 2021, Cartlidge was appointed Parliamentary Under-Secretary of State for Justice and an Assistant Government Whip in the cabinet reshuffle. During his time in office, he introduced the Statutory Instrument which raised Magistrates' sentencing powers in England and Wales from 6 to 12 months. Cartlidge also delivered the Government's initial response to the Criminal Legal Aid Independent Review, which resulted in most criminal legal aid fees being increased by 15%.

On 7 July 2022, Cartlidge resigned from government in the wake of widespread criticism of Boris Johnson's handling of the Chris Pincher scandal, following a large number of other ministerial resignations.

Personal life
Cartlidge is married to Emily, with whom he has four children. His father-in-law is the former Conservative MP, Gerald Howarth, Member of Parliament for Aldershot until 2017.
 
Cartlidge performed a drum solo on Times Radio in September 2020, as part of Times Radio presenter Matt Chorley's coverage of MPs' hobbies and pastimes.

In his contribution to the House of Commons debate on Friday 9th September 2022, the day after the death of Queen Elizabeth II, ‘Tributes to Her late Majesty the Queen’, Cartlidge confessed to having spilt a bottle of red wine on one of the Queen’s carpets whilst working as a kitchen porter in the early 1990s, at the Buckingham Palace Staff Christmas Party, saying: “I pledge my loyalty to His Majesty, and I hope that he is merciful and resists the temptation to put an invoice for cleaning costs in the post".

References

External links

 

 

1974 births
Conservative Party (UK) MPs for English constituencies
Living people
UK MPs 2015–2017
UK MPs 2017–2019
UK MPs 2019–present